The Massachusetts Mental Health Center is a historic psychiatric hospital complex at 75 Fenwood Road in the Longwood medical area of Boston, Massachusetts.

The center was founded in 1912 as the Boston Psychopathic Hospital.  Its original main building and power plant were built that year, with additions in later decades including a therapeutic wing (1954) and research building (1957).  The entire property was surrounded by an iron picket fence. It was listed on the National Register of Historic Places in 1994, representing one of the nation's oldest psychiatric hospitals.  In 2009 the center's historic campus at 74 Fenwood Road was acquired by Partners HealthCare and demolished the following year.  The center continues to operate in modern facilities at 75 Fenwood Road.

See also
National Register of Historic Places listings in southern Boston, Massachusetts

References

External links
Massachusetts Mental Health Center at mass.gov; 75 Fenwood Road
Massachusetts Mental Health Center at 180 Morton St., Jamaica Plain, MA - 02130 (clinics.com)

Historic districts in Suffolk County, Massachusetts
Mental Health Center
Fenway–Kenmore
National Register of Historic Places in Boston
Historic districts on the National Register of Historic Places in Massachusetts